Tarcisio "Ciso" Gitti (18 April 1936 – 6 May 2018) was an Italian lawyer and politician. Born in Gardone Val Trompia, he was the son of Salvatore Angelo Gitti, a member of the Chamber of Deputies. He was a lawyer by profession, and was President of the Province of Brescia from 1972 to 1975. He was elected to the Chamber of Deputies in 1979 and served until 1994. He was Undersecretary of the Treasury from 30 July 1897 to 22 July 1989, and President of COPASIR from 29 January 1991 to 22 April 1992. From 1992 to 1994, he was Vice President of the Chamber of Deputies. He was a member of the Christian Democracy (DC) party, but joined the Italian People's Party in 1994 after the DC's collapse.

Gitti died in Brescia of the evening of 6 May 2018, aged 82. His son, Gregorio Gitti, is a Democratic member of the Chamber of Deputies and a consultant to Giovanni Bazoli, former President of Intesa Sanpaolo.

References 

1936 births
2018 deaths
Christian Democracy (Italy) politicians
Italian People's Party (1994) politicians
Deputies of Legislature VIII of Italy
Deputies of Legislature IX of Italy
Deputies of Legislature X of Italy
Deputies of Legislature XI of Italy
Presidents of the Province of Brescia
20th-century Italian lawyers